Yannick Agnel (born 9 June 1992) is a French former competitive swimmer who specializes in freestyle events, and is a three-time Olympic medalist.  In his Olympic debut at the 2012 Summer Olympics in London, he won gold in the 200-meter freestyle, gold in the 4×100-meter freestyle relay, and silver in the 4×200-meter freestyle relay.  He is the current world record holder in the 400-meter freestyle (short course), the European record holder in the 800-meter freestyle (short course), and the national record holder in the 200- and 400-meter freestyle (long course).

Agnel's success have earned him Swimming Worlds European Swimmer of the Year award in 2012.

Early life
Agnel was born in Nîmes in 1992, the son of a nurse and a director of human resources.  He was named after French tennis player Yannick Noah.  Agnel began swimming at the age of eight after a neighbor spotted his talent and urged his parents to enroll him in a swimming club. He later integrated Skema Business School to study business. He is now in the prestigious French Grande École Paris-Dauphine IX.

Swimming career

Early career
At the 2009 European Junior Swimming Championships, Agnel won the 200- and 400-meter freestyle in European junior record times.  He was also a member of the 4×200-meter freestyle relay that won gold ahead of Russia and Italy.

In April 2010, Agnel set the French record in the 200-meter freestyle with a time of 1:46.35 to beat Amaury Leveaux's record of 1:46.54. In June 2010, he improved his record in the 200-meter freestyle with a time of 1:46.30.

At the 2010 European Junior Swimming Championships, Agnel set the French record in the 400-meter freestyle with a time of 3:46.26 to beat Nicolas Rostoucher's record of 3:46.28 en route to winning gold.

2010 European Championships
At the 2010 European Aquatics Championships, Agnel won gold in the 400-meter freestyle setting a new French and championships record. Agnel then combined with Fabien Gilot, William Meynard, and Alain Bernard in the 4×100-meter freestyle relay to finish second behind Russia.  As the second leg, Agnel had a 48.23 split. As the leadoff leg in the 4×200 m freestyle relay, Agnel broke his own French record in the 200-meter freestyle with a time of 1:45.83.  Agnel, with Clement Lefert, Antton Haramboure, and Jérémy Stravius finished in third place in the 4×200-meter freestyle relay behind Russia and Germany.

2011 World Championships

At the 2011 World Aquatics Championships in Shanghai, Agnel competed in three events.  In his first event, the 400-meter freestyle, Agnel finished in 6th place with a time of 3:45.24.  In his second event, the 200-meter freestyle, Agnel finished in fifth place with a time of 1:44.99, a new French record.  Agnel won his only medal of the competition, a silver, in the 4×200-meter freestyle relay.  Teaming with Grégory Mallet, Jérémy Stravius, and Fabien Gilot, their team had a final time of 7:04.81, a new French record.  The United States finished 1st with a time of 7:02.67.

2012

2012 Summer Olympics

 (NR)'''

At the 2012 Summer Olympics in London, Agnel won a total of three medals: two golds and one silver.  In his first event, Agnel anchored a come-from-behind effort in the 4×100-meter freestyle relay to win gold with Amaury Leveaux, Fabien Gilot, and Clément Lefert.  Diving in with a 0.55 s deficit, Agnel was able to cut that down to a 0.30 s deficit at the 350-meter mark.  In the last 50-meters, Agnel pulled ahead of American Ryan Lochte and France won with a time of 3:09:93 to the United States' time of 3:10:38. Agnel swam the fastest split time of the entire field with a time of 46.74, the only individual to break 47 seconds. The next day, Agnel won his second gold medal in the 200-meter freestyle with a time of 1:43.14, the fastest in French swimming history and 1.79 seconds ahead of silver medal winners Sun Yang and Park Tae-hwan.  In the final, Agnel led from start-to-finish, recording a time of 50.64 in the first 100-meters and 52.50 in the last 100-meters.  His time of 25.98 for the last 50-meters was by far the fastest in the field. Agnel won his final medal, a silver, in the 4×200-meter freestyle relay behind the United States with Amaury Leveaux, Grégory Mallet, and Clément Lefert. He had the fastest split time of the field in the final with a time of 1:43.24 as the anchor leg. In his final event, the 100-meter freestyle, Agnel finished fourth in a personal best time of 47.84, 0.04 s of a second outside the medals. The European Swimming Federation named Agnel male European swimmer of the year 2012.

Post-Olympics
On 15 November 2012, Agnel broke his first world record in the 400-meter freestyle with a time of 3:32.25 during the first day of the French short course nationals in Angers.  In doing so, he bettered the previous record held by German swimmer Paul Biedermann (3.32.77) established in 2009 with a full bodysuit. A day later, he set the European record in the 800-meter freestyle and on 18 November, Agnel just missed Biedermann's world record in the 200-meter freestyle (short course).

At the 2012 European Short Course Swimming Championships in Chartres held a week after the French nationals, Agnel won a total of three medals: two gold and one bronze.

At year's end, Agnel was named the European Swimmer of the Year by Swimming World Magazine''. In 2013, Agnel was made a Knight (Chevalier) of the Légion d'honneur.

2013 World Championships

At the 2013 FINA World Championships in Barcelona, Agnel competed only in three events. On the first day of the tournament, Agnel helped his French team capture the nation's first ever world title over the Americans and the Russians in the 4 × 100 m freestyle relay. Teaming with Florent Manaudou, Fabien Gilot, and Jérémy Stravius in the final, Agnel recorded a lead-off split of 48.76 to deliver the French foursome a sterling time in 3:11.18. Two days later, Agnel added his second gold medal in the 200 m freestyle with a time of 1:44.20, finishing ahead of silver medalist and his training partner Conor Dwyer by 1.07 seconds. In his final event, 4 × 200 m freestyle relay, Agnel, along with Stravius, Grégory Mallet, and Lorys Bourelly, missed the podium by 17-hundredths of a second behind the Chinese team with a fourth-place effort in 7:04.91.

2014
After swimming in Nice, Agnel moved to the US to swim for the North Baltimore Aquatic Club, under coach Bob Bowman. The move proved to be un-successful as at the 2014 European Championship, Agnel was out of form and could only secure a bronze medal in the 200m freestyle. 
After the event, he decided to come back to France and now trains in Mulhouse.

2015
After securing a spot in the French national team, Agnel decided not to compete at the world championship in Kazan due to illness.

2016
Agnel finished in third position in the 200m freestyle event at the French national championships held on 30 March in Montpellier. Jérémy Stravius won the race while Jordan Pothain was second. In a controversial finish, it appeared that Agnel had finished second but failed to make clean contact with the timing pad at the end of the race. Only the top two finishers would qualify for the 2016 Summer Olympics. However, Agnel's path to defending his Olympic 200m freestyle title has been cleared by Pothain's decision to swim the 400m freestyle and not the 200m freestyle. At the Rio Olympics, Agnel failed to go past the heats of the 200m freestyle. He announced his retirement from competitive swimming soon after.

Personal bests

See also
World record progression 400 metres freestyle

References

1992 births
Chevaliers of the Légion d'honneur
Living people
French male freestyle swimmers
Medalists at the FINA World Swimming Championships (25 m)
Sportspeople from Nîmes
Olympic gold medalists for France
Olympic silver medalists for France
Olympic swimmers of France
Swimmers at the 2012 Summer Olympics
Swimmers at the 2016 Summer Olympics
World Aquatics Championships medalists in swimming
World record holders in swimming
European Aquatics Championships medalists in swimming
Medalists at the 2012 Summer Olympics
European champions for France
Olympic gold medalists in swimming
Olympic silver medalists in swimming